Preaek Norint  is a khum (commune) of Aek Phnum District in Battambang Province in north-western Cambodia.

Villages

 Preaek Ta Chraeng
 Preaek Krouch
 Svay Chrum
 Preaek Norint
 Sdei
 Rohal Suong
 Duong Mea
 Reach Doun Kaev
 Ansang Sak
 Preaek Trab

References

Communes of Battambang province
Aek Phnum District